Upper Pilton is a locality split between the Toowoomba Region and the Southern Downs Region, both in Queensland, Australia. In the  Upper Pilton had a population of 63 people.

Geography

History 
In the  Upper Pilton had a population of 63 people.

References 

Toowoomba Region
Southern Downs Region
Localities in Queensland